Khvaja Qivam al-Din Nizam al-Mulk Khvafi was a Persian bureaucrat who served the Timurid Empire in the late 15th-century. 

His father was a provincial judge from Khwaf in the Khorasan region of eastern Iran. According to the contemporary historian Isfizari, Qivam was a descendant of Fasih Khwafi's great-grandfather Khvaja Majd, who ruled in Khvaf in the early 14th-century. In 1471/2, the Timurid ruler of Khorasan, Sultan Husayn Bayqara, appointed Qivam al-Din as his vizier. Together with another vizier Khvaja Afzal al-Din Muhammad Kirmani (appointed in 1473/4), Qivam al-Din plotted to have the powerful bureaucrat Majd al-Din Muhammad Khvafi dismissed through a charge of embezzlement. Pressurized by these two highly competent bureaucrats, Sultan Husayn first had Majd al-Din jailed (as was the tradition), and then started an investigation into the charge. An error on the part of the accusers, resulted in the release of Majd al-Din and drop of the charge. In June 1498, Qivam al-Din was executed through a plot led by his former allies, Afzal al-Din and Ali-Shir Nava'i.

References

Sources 
 
  
 

Officials of the Timurid Empire
Viziers of the Timurid Empire
15th-century Iranian people
1498 deaths
15th-century births
People from Razavi Khorasan Province